The University of San Diego is a private Roman Catholic research university in San Diego, California. 

University of San Diego may also refer to the following in San Diego:
University of California, San Diego, public research university in the UC school system
San Diego State University, public research university in the California State University system
University of San Diego High School, defunct Catholic high school that operated from 1957 to 2005

See also
Education in San Diego